Bosie may mean:
 Northern Scottish dialect (Doric) for a hug.
 an alternate name for New London Hall, Connecticut College's new science center.
 a googly, a type of delivery in the game of cricket.
 a nickname for Lord Alfred Douglas, the lover of Oscar Wilde, addressed as such in Wilde's letter from prison, De Profundis.
 a nickname for the Bösendorfer piano.